Herti Allmend Stadion is a multi-use stadium in Zug, Switzerland.  It is currently used mostly for football matches and is the home ground of Zug 94 and SC Cham in 2007-08 Challenge League season.  The stadium holds 4,900 people and was opened in 1979.

Football venues in Switzerland
Buildings and structures in the canton of Zug
Zug
Multi-purpose stadiums in Switzerland